Not Far Now is Richard Shindell's eighth studio album and sixth album of original material.

Track listing 
All tracks written by Richard Shindell except where noted.

 "Parasol Ants" – 3:46
 "A Juggler Out In Traffic" – 4:35
 "Gethsemani Goodbye" – 4:14
 "¿Que Hago Ahora?" (Silvio Rodríguez) – 2:25
 "Bye Bye" – 4:02
 "Mariana's Table" – 4:36
 "State Of The Union" – 5:17 
 "One Man's Arkansas" – 4:26
 "Get Up Clara" – 3:05
 "The Mountain" (Dave Carter) – 3:55
 "Balloon Man" – 4:11

Personnel 
 Alejandro Baccarat – photography
 Mark Dann – engineer, mastering, mixing
 Meghan Dewar – design, layout design
 Seth Glier – Hammond organ
 Lisa Gutkin – baritone violin
 Steve Holley – drums, tambourine, claves, cajon, shaker, cowbell
 Lucy Kaplansky – harmony vocals
 Viktor Krauss – engineer, acoustic bass
 Rich Lamb – engineer
 Dennis McDermott – percussion, drums
 Sara Milonovich – violin, viola, engineer, harmony vocals, string arrangements, baritone violin
 Brian Mitchell – Hammond organ, Wurlitzer
 John Putnam – pedal steel, electric guitar, tiple
 Lincoln Schleifer – electric bass, engineer
 Richard Shindell – acoustic guitar, bouzouki, percussion, piano, electric bass, electric guitar, vocals, engineer, harmony vocals, cajon, piano strings, 12 string electric guitar
 Ben Wittman – percussion, cymbals, drums, tom-tom, shaker

Mariana's EP 
Mariana's EP: Alt Versions and No Shows from Not Far Now is a limited edition release with alternate versions and outtakes from Not Far Now. It was first made available to participants in Shindell's fan-based financing program for Not Far Now. It has since been available as a download only from his web site.

Track listing
 "Get Up Clara" (Alt mix) – 3:05
 "Balloon Man" (Alt version) – 4:28
 "Mariana's Table" (Alt version) – 5:06
 "State of the Union" (Demo version) – 5:24
 "I Am" (Unreleased) – 3:52
 "Hideous Grin" (Previously unreleased) – 4:31

References 

Richard Shindell albums
2009 albums